Almeh Rural District is a rural district (dehestan) in Samalqan District, Maneh and Samalqan County, North Khorasan Province, Iran. At the 2006 census, its population was 7,517, in 1,980 families.  The rural district has 10 villages.

References 

Rural Districts of North Khorasan Province
Maneh and Samalqan County